Raphaël Krikorian (born 22 April 1968 in Reims) is a French  mathematician, currently a professor at the CY Cergy Paris University. He is known for his contributions to dynamical systems. 

After studying at the École polytechnique, Krikorian earned his PhD under supervision of Michael Herman in 1996. 

He published his scientific work in such journals as Annals of Mathematics, Duke Mathematical Journal and Inventiones Mathematicae. Krikorian is a member of the editorial boards of Journal of Dynamics and Differential Equations and Journal of Modern Dynamics.

He was an invited speaker at International Congress of Mathematicians in Rio de Janeiro in 2018, and at the conference Dynamics, Equations and Applications in Kraków in 2019.

References

1968 births
Living people
French mathematicians
20th-century French mathematicians
21st-century French mathematicians